Kolesnichenko, Kolesnychenko, Kolisnychenko, or Kolisnichenko is a surname. Notable people with the surname include:

 Alexandra Kolesnichenko (born 1992), Uzbekistani tennis player
 Kirill Kolesnichenko (born 2000), Russian footballer
 Olena Kolesnichenko (born 1993), Ukrainian hurdler
 Svetlana Kolesnichenko (born 1993), Russian synchronized swimmer
 Vladimirs Koļesņičenko (born 1980), Latvian footballer

See also
 

Ukrainian-language surnames